Guberman is a surname. Notable people with the surname include:

 Igor Guberman (born 1936), Russian writer and poet of Jewish ancestry
 Scott Guberman (born 1971), American keyboardist
 Shelia Guberman (born 1930), Russian-American computer scientist